Callionymus leucobranchialis, the Whitegill dragonet, is a species of dragonet found in the Pacific waters around the Philippines at a depth of about .

References 

L
Fish described in 1941